Andrew Winston Aleong (born 30 December 1943) is a Trinidad and Tobago former cricketer and footballer.

References

1943 births
Living people
Trinidad and Tobago cricketers
Trinidad and Tobago footballers
Trinidad and Tobago international footballers
Association football forwards
Pan American Games medalists in football
Pan American Games bronze medalists for Trinidad and Tobago
Footballers at the 1967 Pan American Games
Medalists at the 1967 Pan American Games